Across the Great Divide is a 1976 American Western film directed by Stewart Raffill and starring Robert Logan, Heather Rattray, and George Buck Flower. The film was shot on location in Utah and Canada.

Plot
In 1876, two orphans, Holly and Jason, travel across the Rocky Mountains to claim their inheritance at the end of the Oregon Trail. They run into Zachariah Coop, a gambler on the run from a group of angry men. Coop tries to join the two kids, but at first they don't know whether to trust him. The trio shows unyielding courage in the face of hardship, adventure and danger as they travel across the Great Divide to reach their dream.

Cast
 Robert Logan as Zachariah Coop
 Heather Rattray as Holly Smith
 Mark Edward Hall as Jason Smith
 George Buck Flower as Ben
 Hal Bokar as Sternface
 Frank Salsedo as Mosa

Release
The film was released on December 20, 1976 by Pacific International Enterprises.

The film was officially released on DVD on January 1, 2003. More recently, the film was released on Blu-ray and digital format by Lionsgate.

See also
 List of American films of 1976
 The Adventures of the Wilderness Family
 The Sea Gypsies
 Matt and Jenny

References

External links
 
 
 
 

1976 films
1976 Western (genre) films
American Western (genre) films
Films directed by Stewart Raffill
1976 drama films
1970s English-language films
1970s American films